Vedram Bhati (born 1951) is an Indian politician and a member of the 16th Legislative Assembly of Uttar Pradesh of India. A notable Gujjar leader from Uttar Pradesh, he represents the Jewar constituency of Uttar Pradesh and was a member of the Bahujan Samaj Party (BSP) from 2002 to 2019 and later joined the Bharatiya Janata Party.

Early life and education
Vedram Bhati was born in Gautam Budh Nagar district. He attended the Chaudhary Charan Singh University and attained Bachelor of Laws degree.

Political career
Vedram Bhati has been a MLA for three terms. He represented the Jewar constituency in the 16th Legislative Assembly of Uttar Pradesh and is a member of the Bahujan Samaj Party political party.

Positions held

See also

Jewar
Sixteenth Legislative Assembly of Uttar Pradesh
Uttar Pradesh Legislative Assembly

References 

Bahujan Samaj Party politicians from Uttar Pradesh
Uttar Pradesh MLAs 2002–2007
Uttar Pradesh MLAs 2007–2012
Uttar Pradesh MLAs 2012–2017
Chaudhary Charan Singh University alumni
People from Gautam Buddh Nagar district
1951 births
Living people
Bharatiya Janata Party politicians from Uttar Pradesh